Ridge Township is a former township in Barber County, Kansas, USA.  As of the 2000 census, its population was 4. However, according to the Kansas State Historical Society, the township had already merged into neighboring Sharon Township as of March 22, 1999. It was not included as a separate listing in the 2010 census.

Geography
According to the USGS, it contains one cemetery, Burgess.

References
 USGS Geographic Names Information System (GNIS)

External links
 US-Counties.com
 City-Data.com

Townships in Barber County, Kansas
Townships in Kansas